The FIL World Luge Championships 1974 took place in Königssee, West Germany for a record third time. Königssee had hosted the event previously in 1969 and 1970.

Men's singles

Women's singles

Men's doubles

Medal table

References
Men's doubles World Champions
Men's singles World Champions
Women's singles World Champions

FIL World Luge Championships
1974 in luge
1974 in German sport
Luge in Germany